János Takács (born December 5, 1954) is a male former international table tennis player from Hungary.

He won a gold medal at the 1979 World Table Tennis Championships in the Swaythling Cup (men's team event) with Gábor Gergely, István Jónyer, Tibor Klampár and Tibor Kreisz for Hungary. He now lives in Geneva.

See also
 List of table tennis players
 List of World Table Tennis Championships medalists

References

Hungarian male table tennis players
Living people
1954 births
World Table Tennis Championships medalists
20th-century Hungarian people